Dan Flavin was an American minimalist artist known for creating sculptural objects and installations from commercially available fluorescent light fixtures.

Collections

Sculptures in collectionsdiacenter.org accessed June 6, 2008

United States

Alaska

untitled (to Tom), 1979-1980, James Martin Fitzgerald United States Courthouse (collection of General Services Administration), Anchorage

Arizona

untitled (in memory of "Sandy" Calder) V 1/5, 1977, Private Collector, Scottsdale

California

untitled (to Marianne), 1970, San Diego Museum of Contemporary Art, La Jolla
monument for V Tatlin, 1969, Museum of Contemporary Art, Los Angeles
untitled (to Barnett Newman) two, 1971, San Francisco Museum of Modern Art
untitled (to Robert, Joe, and Michael), 1975–82, Museum of Contemporary Art, Los Angeles
untitled (to Charles Cowles), 1963, Museum of Contemporary Art, Los Angeles
Mrs. Reppin's survival, 1966, Norton Simon Museum, Pasadena
untitled 1/3, 1969, Norton Simon Museum, Pasadena

Colorado

untitled (for A. C.), 1992, Denver Art Museum, Denver

District of Columbia

"monument" for V. Tatlin 1/5, 1968, National Gallery of Art, Washington
"monument" for V. Tatlin 4/5, 1969–70, National Gallery of Art, Washington
untitled (to Barnett Newman to commemorate his simple problem, red, yellow, and blue) 4/5, 1969–70, National Gallery of Art, Washington
untitled (to Helga and Carlo, with respect and affection), 1974, Hirshhorn Museum and Sculpture Garden, Washington

Illinois

untitled (monument for V. Tatlin), 1970, Private Collector, Chicago
the alternate diagonals of March 2, 1964 (to Don Judd), 1964, Private Collector, Chicago

Indiana

untitled (to Katharina and Christoph), [from the series to European couples] a.p., 1971, Indianapolis Museum of Art, Indianapolis

Iowa

untitled (for Ellen), Des Moines Art Center, Des Moines

Massachusetts

Barbara Roses, 1962–1965, Smith College, Smith College Museum of Art, Northampton

Maryland

 Untitled (To Barnett Newman for “Who’s Afraid of Virginia Woolf”). 1993-1994. The Baltimore Museum of Art.
Michigan

"monument" for V. Tatlin, 1969, Detroit Institute of Arts, Detroit

Minnesota

untitled, 1963, Walker Art Center, Minneapolis
untitled, 1966, Walker Art Center, Minneapolis
"monument" for V. Tatlin 3/5, 1969, Walker Art Center, Minneapolis

Nebraska

untitled, 1964, University of Nebraska-Lincoln, Sheldon Memorial Art Gallery and Sculpture Garden, Lincoln

New Hampshire

untitled (To Elita and her baby, Cintra), 1970, Dartmouth College, Hood Museum of Art, Hanover

New York

gold, pink and red, red 2/3, 1964, Dia Art Foundation, Beacon
monument 4 for those who have been killed in ambush (to P.K. who reminded me about death) 2/3, 1966, Dia Art Foundation, Beacon
the diagonal of May 25, 1963 (to Constantin Brâncuși) 3/3, 1963, Dia Art Foundation, Beacon (first entirely fluorescent work)
the nominal three (to William of Ockham) 2/3, 1963, Dia Art Foundation, Beacon
untitled (to a man, George McGovern) 2 2/3, 1972, Dia Art Foundation, Beacon
untitled (to the real Dan Hill) 1b 1/5, 1978, Dia Art Foundation, Beacon
untitled, 1996, Dia Art Foundation, Beacon
red out of a corner (to Annina) 3/3, 1963, Dan Flavin Art Institute, Bridgehampton
untitled 2/3, 1976, Dan Flavin Art Institute, Bridgehampton
untitled (to Robert, Joe and Michael) 2/3, 1975–81, Dan Flavin Art Institute, Bridgehampton
untitled (to Jan and Ron Greenberg) 2/3, 1972–73, Dan Flavin Art Institute, Bridgehampton
untitled (in honor of Harold Joachim) 3 1/3, 1977, Dan Flavin Art Institute, Bridgehampton
untitled (to Katharina and Christoph), [from the series to European couples] 1/5, 1971, Dan Flavin Art Institute, Bridgehampton
untitled (to Jim Schaeufele) 1 1/3, 1972, Dan Flavin Art Institute, Bridgehampton
untitled (to Jim Schaeufele) 2 1/3, 1972, Dan Flavin Art Institute, Bridgehampton
untitled (to Jim Schaeufele) 3 1/3, 1972, Dan Flavin Art Institute, Bridgehampton
"monument" for V. Tatlin, 1964, Museum of Modern Art, New York
pink out of a corner - to Jasper Johns, 1963, Museum of Modern Art, New York
untitled (to the "Innovator" of Wheeling Peachblow) 2/3, 1968, Museum of Modern Art, New York
untitled, 1968, Museum of Modern Art, New York
three fluorescent tubes, 1963, Private Collector, New York
icon V (Coran's Broadway flesh), 1962, Private Collector, New York
icon VIII (to Blind Melon Jefferson), 1962, Private Collector, New York
"monument" for V. Tatlin 1/5, 1964, Private Collector, New York
"monument" for V. Tatlin 4/5, 1964, Private Collector, New York
untitled (to Henri Matisse) 3/3, 1964, Private Collector, New York
untitled (for Ad Reinhardt) 1b 1/5, 1990, Private Collector, New York
greens crossing greens (to Piet Mondrian who lacked green), 1966, Solomon R. Guggenheim Museum, New York
the nominal three (to William of Ockham), 1963, Solomon R. Guggenheim Museum, New York
untitled (to Tracy, to celebrate the love of a lifetime), 1992, Solomon R. Guggenheim Museum, New York
untitled (to Ward Jackson, and old friend and colleague who, during the Fall of 1957 when I finally returned to New York from Washington and joined him to work together in this museum, kindly communicated), 1971, Solomon R. Guggenheim Museum, New York
untitled (for Robert, with fond regards), 1977, Whitney Museum of American Art, New York
untitled, 1966, Whitney Museum of American Art, New York
untitled, 1966, Whitney Museum of American Art, New York

North Carolina

untitled, 1971, Mint Museum of Art, Charlotte

Ohio

untitled (to Janie Lee) one, 1971, Columbus Museum of Art, Columbus
untitled (Fondly to Helen), 1976, Private Collector, Cincinnati
untitled (to Ellen Johnson, fondly), 1975, Oberlin College, Allen Memorial Art Museum, Oberlin

Oregon

untitled (To Donna) II , 1971, Portland Art Museum
untitled (for Robert Ryman) 2/5, 1996, Miller-Meigs Collection, Portland

Texas

alternate diagonals of March 2, 1964 (to Don Judd) 2/3, 1964, Dallas Museum of Art, Dallas
diagonal of May 25, 1963 (to Constantin Brâncuși) 2/3, 1963, Modern Art Museum of Fort Worth, Fort Worth
Untitled (for you Leo, in long respect and affection) 4 2/5, 1978, Modern Art Museum of Fort Worth, Fort Worth
monument 1 for V. Tatlin, 1964, Menil Collection, Houston
untitled (to Barbara Wood), 1970, Menil Collection, Houston
untitled frieze, 1996, Menil Collection, Richmond Hall, Houston
untitled foyer, 1996, Menil Collection, Richmond Hall, Houston
untitled interior, 1996, Menil Collection, Richmond Hall, Houston
icon III, 1962, Chinati Foundation, Marfa
icon VI (Ireland dying)(to Louis Sullivan), 1962, Chinati Foundation, Marfa

Washington

untitled (To Donna), 1973, Private Collector, Seattle

International

Canada

the alternate diagonals of March 2, 1964 (To Don Judd), 1964, Art Gallery of Ontario, Toronto, Ontario
untitled corner piece, Art Gallery of Ontario, Toronto, Ontario
"monument" for V. Tatlin, 1969–1970, National Gallery of Canada, Ottawa, Ontario
"monument" for V. Tatlin, 1968, National Gallery of Canada, Ottawa, Ontario
untitled (to Barnett Newman to commemorate his simple problem, red, yellow and blue), 1970, National Gallery of Canada, Ottawa, Ontario
untitled, 1971, Winnipeg Art Gallery, Winnipeg, Manitoba

France

"monument" for V. Tatlin, 1975, Musee National d'Art Moderne, Centre Georges-Pompidou, Paris
untitled (To Donna) 5a, 1971, Musee National d'Art Moderne, Centre Georges-Pompidou, Paris

The Netherlands

 untitled (to Barnett Newman to commemorate his simple problem, red, yellow, and blue), 1970, Stedelijk Museum, Amsterdam
 monument for V. Tatlin, 1969, Stedelijk museum, Amsterdam
 untitled (to Piet Mondrian through his preferred colors, red, yellow and blue, Stedelijk museum, Amsterdam
 Projects 1963-1995, 1996, Stedelijk museum, Amsterdam
 Untitled, 1968, Museum Boijmans Van Beuningen, Rotterdam
 Untitled (to Karin), 1966, Museum Kröller-Müller, Otterlo
 Untitled (to Ingrid Nibbe), Museum Kröller-Müller, Otterlo
 Untitled (to a man, George McGovern) (1972), Van Abbe museum, Eindhoven
 Untitled, (quietly, to the memory of Mia Visser),1977, Museum Kröller-Müller, Otterlo

Switzerland

 Hallen für Neue Kunst Schaffhausen, Switzerland

United Kingdom

"monument" to V. Tatlin, 1975, Gallery of Modern Art, Edinburgh, Scotland
monument for V. Tatlin, 1966–1969, Tate Gallery, London
untitled, 1969, Tate Gallery, London
a primary picture 2/3, 1964, Hermes Trust U.K., London
untitled (to Lucie Rie, master potter) 1c 2/5, 1990,  Waddington Galleries Ltd., London
untitled (to Lucie Rie, master potter) 1jjj 2/5, 1990,  Waddington Galleries Ltd., London
untitled (to Lucie Rie, master potter) 1o 1/5, 1990,  Waddington Galleries Ltd., London

Estate Collection

icon I (the heart) (to the light of Sean McGovern which blesses everyone), 1961
icon II (the mystery) (to John Reeves), 1961
pink out of a corner - to Jasper Johns, 1963
"monument" 1 for V. Tatlin, 1964, Sonja Flavin collection
Corner Monument 4, 1966
"monument" for V. Tatlin, 1967
"monument" for V. Tatlin, 1967
untitled (to Janie Lee) one, 1971
untitled (to Emily), 1973
untitled (to you, Heiner, with admiration and affection), 1973
untitled (in honor of Harold Joachim) 3, 1977
"monument" for V. Tatlin, 1981
untitled (to Piet Mondrian), 1985
untitled (for Donald Judd, colorist) 1, 1987
untitled (for Donald Judd, colorist) 2, 1987
untitled (for Donald Judd, colorist) 3, 1987
untitled (for Donald Judd, colorist) 4, 1987
untitled (for Donald Judd, colorist) 5, 1987
untitled, 1989
untitled (for Ad Reinhardt) 2b, 1990

Permanent installations
From 1975, Flavin installed permanent works in Europe and the United States, including "Untitled. In memory of Urs Graf" at the Kunstmuseum Basel (conceived 1972, realized 1975) 
 Rijksmuseum Kröller-Müller, Otterlo, Netherlands (1977)
 Hudson River Museum, Yonkers, New York (1979)
 United States Courthouse, Anchorage, Alaska (1979–89)
 Staatliche Kunsthalle Baden-Baden, Germany (1989)
 MetroTech Center (with Skidmore, Owings & Merrill), Brooklyn, New York (1992)
 seven lampposts outside the Städtische Galerie im Lenbachhaus, Munich (1994)
 Hypovereinsbank, Munich (1995)
 Institut Arbeit und Technik/Wissenschaftspark, Gelsenkirchen, Germany (1996)
 Union Bank of Switzerland, Bern (1996)

Sites for Flavin's architectural "interventions" include Grand Central Station in New York (1976), Hamburger Bahnhof in Berlin (1996), and the Chinati Foundation in Marfa, Texas (2000). His large-scale work in colored fluorescent light for six buildings at the Chinati Foundation was initiated in the early 1980s, although the final plans were not completed until 1996. His last artwork was a site-specific work at Santa Maria Annunciata in Chiesa Rossa, Milan, Italy. The 1930s church was designed by Giovanni Muzio. The design for the piece was completed two days before Flavin's death on November 29, 1996. Its installation was completed one year later with the assistance of the Dia Center for the Arts and Fondazione Prada.

References

External links

The Estate of Dan Flavin at David Zwirner

Flavin
Sculptures by American artists